The 2020–21 Temple Owls men's basketball team represented Temple University during the 2020–21 NCAA Division I men's basketball season. The Owls, led by second-year head coach Aaron McKie, play their home games at the Liacouras Center in Philadelphia as a member of the American Athletic Conference. They finished the season 5–11, 4–10 in AAC Play to finish in 9th place. They lost in the first round of the AAC tournament to South Florida.

Previous season
The Owls finished the 2019–20 season 14–17, 6–12 in AAC play to finish in tenth place. They entered as the No. 10 seed in the AAC tournament, which was ultimately cancelled due to the coronavirus pandemic.

Offseason

Departures

Incoming transfers

2020 recruiting class

2021 recruiting class

Preseason

AAC preseason media poll

On October 28, The American released the preseason Poll and other preseason awards

Roster

Schedule and results

COVID-19 impact

Due to the ongoing COVID-19 pandemic, the Owls' schedule is subject to change, including the cancellation or postponement of individual games, the cancellation of the entire season, or games played either with minimal fans or without fans in attendance and just essential personnel.

On November 26, Temple paused activities following positive COVID-19 tests within their program for 14 days. This resulted in the cancellation of participation in the Hall of Fame Tip Off (alongside Rhode Island and Virginia Tech) as well as games against La Salle, Villanova, and Saint Joseph's.
The games at Cincinnati scheduled for February 4 was moved to Philadelphia.
The game at East Carolina rescheduled for February 11 was moved to Philadelphia.
The game vs. Cincinnati rescheduled for February 12 was moved to Cincinnati. 
The game at South Florida rescheduled to February 21 was moved to Philadelphia.
The game vs. South Florida scheduled for February 24 was moved to Tampa.

Schedule

|-
!colspan=12 style=| Regular season

|-
!colspan=12 style=| AAC tournament
|-

|-

Awards and honors

American Athletic Conference honors

All-AAC Awards
Sportsmanship Award: J.P. Moorman II

All-AAC Third Team
Khalif Battle

All-AAC Freshman Team
Damian Dunn

Source

References

Temple Owls men's basketball seasons
Temple
Temple
Temple